Snakeroot may refer to different plant taxa that have been used as a folk remedy against snakebites:

 Ageratina – a genus with species native to the warm and temperate Americas
 Certain plants in the temperate Northern Hemisphere genus Eupatorium
 Asarum canadense – Canadian snakeroot
 Aristolochia serpentaria – Virginia snakeroot
 Eryngium cuneifolium – Snakeroot
 Plantago major – Snakeroot
 Polygala senega – Seneca snakeroot
 Rauvolfia serpentina – Indian snakeroot

See also
 Black snakeroot (disambiguation)